Dunkettle may refer to:

 An area in the east of Cork (city), Ireland
 Dunkettle Interchange, a major road junction in the area
 Dunkettle railway station, a former station serving the area